John Dunstaple (or Dunstable,  – 24 December 1453) was an English composer whose music helped inaugurate the transition from the medieval to the Renaissance periods. The central proponent of the Contenance angloise style, Dunstaple was the leading English composer of his time, and is often coupled with William Byrd and Henry Purcell as England's most important early music composers. His surviving music is exclusively vocal, and frequently uses isorhythms, while pioneering the prominent use of harmonies with thirds and sixths. His style would have an immense influence on the subsequent music of continental Europe, inspiring composers such as Du Fay, Binchois, Ockeghem and Busnois.

Information on Dunstaple's life is largely non-existent or speculative, with the only certain date of his activity being his death on Christmas Eve of 1453. Probably born in Dunstable in Bedfordshire during the late 14th-century, Dunstaple was associated with Humphrey, Duke of Gloucester and Joan of Navarre, and,  through them, St Albans Abbey. Another important patron was John, Duke of Bedford, with whom Dunstaple may have travelled to France.

Life and career
Nothing is known for certain of John Dunstaple's background or early life. This uncertainty, and the general vagueness surrounding most details of his life, has led to much speculation and sometimes fictionalized information concerning his life and career. Some of the spurious information comes from misreadings of Johannes Tinctoris's writings, leading to the erroneous identification of the composer with the 10th-century saint Dunstan. Dunstaple's birthdate is a conjecture based on his earliest surviving works from around 1410–1420, which suggests he was born in the late 14th century; the musicologist Margaret Bent records . His birthplace is unknown, though it is assumed that his family adopted their surname after the town of Dunstable, Bedfordshire. Modern scholarship has sometimes used the spelling 'Dunstable' to match the town's name, though sources of the composer's time generally refer to him as 'Dunstaple' instead. The musicologist Margaret Bent notes that the 'p' spelling is more than twice as common as the 'b' variant in musical sources, and while the few extant English sources use the 'b' and 'p' variants with equal frequency, contemporary non-musical sources almost exclusively follow the 'p' spelling. Less common spellings include 'Dunstapell', 'Dumstable' and 'Donstaple', among others; one source simply inscribed 'J. D.'. Records from the early 15th century include many references to people named (or with a similar name to) 'John Dunstaple', making it difficult to identify the composer. The more plausible candidates include a canon of Hereford Cathedral (1419–1440) named 'John Dunstavylle', though there is no convincing evidence for this. However, the composer is usually identified as the 'John Dunstaple' that owned a series of astronomy treatises and was described as a 'musician with the Duke of Bedford'.

Nothing is known of his musical training and background. He was clearly a highly educated man, though there is no record of an association with either Oxford or Cambridge universities. He is widely held to have been in the royal service of John of Lancaster, 1st Duke of Bedford, the fourth son of Henry IV and brother of Henry V. As such he may have stayed in France for some time, since the duke was Regent of France from 1423 to 1429, and then Governor of Normandy from 1429 to his death in 1435. He owned property in Normandy, and also in Cambridgeshire, Essex and London, according to tax records of 1436. After the death in 1437 of another patron, the Dowager Queen Joan, he evidently was in the service of Humphrey, Duke of Gloucester, the fifth son of Henry IV.

Unlike many composers of the time, he was probably not a cleric, though there are links with St Albans Abbey (see below); he was probably married, based on the record of women sharing his name in his parish, and he also owned a manor in Hertfordshire. In addition to his work as a composer, he had a contemporary reputation as an astronomer, astrologer, and mathematician (for example, a volume in the Bodleian Library, largely in the hand of William Worcester, acknowledges that certain information within it had been copied from Dunstaple's writings). Some of his astrological works have survived in manuscript, possibly in his own handwriting.

Dunstaple's connections with St Albans Abbey are at least twofold:
the abbot John Whethamstede is associated with the Duke of Gloucester (who was buried at St Albans following his death in 1447), and Dunstaple's isorhythmic motet Albanus roseo rutilat, possibly with some of the Latin words adapted by Whethamstede from an older poem, was clearly written for St Albans, possibly for a visit to the abbey by the Duke of Bedford in 1426.
Whethamstede's plan for a magnificent library for the abbey in 1452–53 included a set of twelve stained glass windows devoted to the various branches of learning. Dunstaple is clearly, if indirectly, referred to in some of the verses the abbot composed for each window, not only music but also astronomy, medicine, and astrology.

Dunstaple is known to have owned two manuscripts by Boethius: a copy of De musica and De arthmetica.

He died on Christmas Eve 1453, as recorded in his epitaph, which was in the church of St Stephen Walbrook in London (until it was destroyed in the Great Fire of 1666). This was also his burial place. The epitaph—stating that he had "secret knowledge of the stars"—had been recorded in the early 17th century, and was reinstated in the church in 1904.

Music

The musical output of medieval England was prodigious, yet almost all music manuscripts were destroyed during the English Reformation, particularly as a result of the Dissolution of the Monasteries in 1536–1540. As a result, most of Dunstaple's work has had to be recovered from continental sources (predominantly those from northern Italy and the southern Alps).

Because numerous copies of his works have been found in Italian and German manuscripts, his fame must have been widespread. Two problems face musicologists of the 15th century: first, determining which of the many surviving anonymous works were written by which composers and, second, unraveling conflicting attributions. This is made even more difficult for English composers such as Dunstaple: scribes in England frequently copied music without any ascription, rendering it immediately anonymous; and, while continental scribes were more assiduous in this regard, many works published in Dunstaple's name have other, potentially equally valid, attributions in different sources to other composers, including Gilles Binchois, John Forest and, Leonel Power.

Of the works attributed to him only about fifty survive, among which are two complete masses, three sets of connected mass sections, fourteen individual mass sections, twelve complete isorhythmic motets (including the famous one which combines the hymn Veni creator spiritus and the sequence Veni sancte spiritus, and the less well-known Albanus roseo rutilat mentioned above), as well as twenty-seven separate settings of various liturgical texts, including three Magnificats and seven settings of Marian antiphons, such as Alma redemptoris Mater and Salve Regina, Mater misericordiae. Dunstaple was one of the first to compose masses using a single melody as cantus firmus. A good example of this technique is his Missa Rex seculorum.

He is believed to have written secular music, but no songs in the vernacular can be attributed to him with any degree of certainty: although the French-texted rondeau Puisque m’amour is attributed to Dunstaple in two sources and there is no reason to doubt his authorship, the ballade remained the more favoured form for English secular song at this time and there is limited opportunity for comparison with the rest of his output. The popular melody "O rosa bella", once thought to be by Dunstaple, is now attributed to John Bedingham (or Bedyngham). Yet, because so much of the surviving 15th-century repertory of English carols is anonymous, and Dunstaple is known to have written many, most scholars consider it highly likely—for stylistic as well as statistical reasons—that some of the anonymous carols from this time are actually by Dunstaple.

Influence

Dunstaple's influence on the continent's musical vocabulary was enormous, particularly considering the relative paucity of his (attributable) works. He was recognized for possessing something never heard before in music of the Burgundian School: la contenance angloise ("the English countenance"), a term used by the poet Martin le Franc in his Le Champion des Dames. Le Franc added that the style influenced Dufay and Binchois—high praise indeed.

Writing a few decades later in about 1476, the Flemish composer and music theorist Tinctoris reaffirmed the powerful influence Dunstaple had, stressing the "new art" that Dunstaple had inspired. Tinctoris hailed Dunstaple as the fons et origo of the style, its "wellspring and origin."

The contenance angloise, while not defined by Martin le Franc, was probably a reference to Dunstaple's stylistic trait of using full triadic harmony, along with a liking for the interval of the third. Assuming that he had been on the continent with the Duke of Bedford, Dunstaple would have been introduced to French fauxbourdon; borrowing some of the sonorities, he created elegant harmonies in his own music using thirds and sixths. Taken together, these are seen as defining characteristics of early Renaissance music, and both Le Franc's and Tinctoris's comments suggest that many of these traits may have originated in England, taking root in the Burgundian School around the middle of the century.

Editions

Recordings
1982 – John Dunstable – Motets, Hilliard Ensemble, dir. Paul Hillier EMI Reflexe 1467031, reissued with music of Leonel Power, on Veritas x2 50999 6 02493 2 6.
1996 – Dunstaple: Sacred Works, Orlando Consort. Metronome METCD1009.
2003 – Canticum Canticorum. In Praise of Love: The Song of Songs in the Renaissance. Capilla Flamenca. Eufoda 1359. Contains a recording of Quam pulchra es by John Dunstable
2005 – John Dunstable – Sweet Harmony – Masses and Motets, recorded by Tonus Peregrinus for the Naxos label.
2012 – O rosa bella Ave maris stella and Quam pulchra es by John Dunstaple have been recorded by the Lumina Vocal Ensemble

Notes

References

Sources
 
  
  
 Stanley Boorman, John A. Emerson, David Hiley, David Fallows, Thomas B. Payne, Elizabeth Aubrey, Lorenz Welker, Manuel Pedro Ferreira, Ernest H. Sanders, Peter M. Lefferts, Ursula Günther, Gilbert Reaney, Kurt von Fischer, Gianluca D’Agostino, Charles Hamm, Jerry Call, and Herbert Kellman. "Sources, MS." In Grove Music Online. Oxford Music Online, http://www.oxfordmusiconline.com/subscriber/article/grove/music/50158pg28 (accessed December 29, 2008).

Further reading 
See  for an extensive bibliography

External links

 
 
 
 Biography and discography from The Medieval Music & Arts Foundation

People from Dunstable
English classical composers
Renaissance composers
15th-century English people
1390 births
1453 deaths
Burials at St Stephen Walbrook
English male classical composers